Anwesshaa (born Anwesha Mita Dattagupta; 15 December 1993, changed her artist name to Anwesshaa[1][2][3][4]) is an Indian singer and composer in Hindi, Bengali, Kannada, Tamil, Marathi and others Indian languages. She first appeared in the reality show Amul STAR Voice of India, Chhote Ustaad at the age of 13.

Shankar Mahadevan said that '"she was the best singer that ever emerged from a reality show after Shreya Ghoshal in the 90s". Anwesshaa appeared on national television for the first time in the year 2007. Thereafter, she has been a part of various other shows. She started her career as a playback singer with the song "Ek Je Achhe Raja" in the Bengali film Khela (2008). Anwesshaa's first breakthrough in Bollywood was in Golmaal Returns for Pritam Chakraborty at the age of 14. She has recorded songs for many films including 'I am 24, Raanjhanaa', 'Revolver Rani', 'Dangerous Ishq', 'Panchlait', 'I am Banni', 'Kaanchi', 'Prem Ratan Dhan payo', 'Expose', 'Gurudakshina', 'Do lafzon ki kahani', 'ye kaisa Tigdam', 'Bansuri', 'I love Desi', 'Love you soniyo', 'Dhoop chaav, Malhar' and others. Apart from Hindi and Bengali, she has also made her debut with other Indian languages, including Tamil, Telugu, Kannada, Malayalam, Gujarati, Marathi, Nepali, Rajasthani, Bhojpuri and also in Bangladesh films. Her playbacks are for around 500 movies across all languages till date. She has received honours like Filmfare Award (East), Mirchi Music Award (Bangla and South), Tele Cine Award, Tele Samman, Big Music Award, Women Entertainers Award, Star Parivar Award, Chitrapat Padarpan Puraskar (Marathi non-film), Gujarat Government Award (For gujarati film song), Academia Award (from Los Angeles, USA for independent song), etc. She has worked in two Bangla films as a Composer songwriter and spreading her wings towards the independent music zone. One of her singles in 2020 'Balcony' released during the lockdown got featured on Best of Indian music. Very recently Besabri, made by her and sung by herself and Abhay Jodhpurkar appeared in the no.2 position of Top Indian songs in extravaganza.in. Sunidhi Chauhan, Javed Ali, Abhishek Ray, Abhay Jodhpurkar and many others have rendered her compositions widening the spectrum of her experiences.

Biography 
Anwesha is a student of Lycée School, Kolkata. She  was born in Virar, Maharashtra. When she was four, the family shifted base to their hometown Kolkata. Her schooling happened in Lycee. Later on, she completed her graduation from Amity University. Reading and watching movies is her favourite hobbies.

Musical background 
Anwesshaa is a second generation musician and by the grace of her mother, she got a culture at home which was inclusive of literature and music. Formal training started at the age of four from her Guru Shri Jayant Sarkar, who is a senior disciple of Pandit Ajoy Chakraborty. Lately she has been closely associated with Pandit ji as well which allowed her to learn from him. Indirectly, the singers and composers whose work she has grown up on are a huge source of inspiration.

Anwesha achieved 1st Division with Distinction in Hindustani Vocal and Rabindra Sangeet under Bangiya Sangeet Parishad Examination (2002–03 and 2003–04). She also became one of the few recipients of the Jugal Srimal Talent Scholarship in Rabindra Sangeet, given by Tagore Foundation.

Anwesha was the Winner of "Young Talent Contest – 2004" in Indian Popular Vocal category (Junior) organized by the Calcutta School of Music. She has also won the All Bengal (Inter School) Music Competition 2006 organized by Smile World, an NGO. She was also the runner up at Amul Star Voice of India Chhote Ustaad. [9] Here is a recent interview.

Early public appearances 
Anwesha performed in Sabujer Deshe in 2000 (ETV Bangla). She was a Mega Finalist in Tarana music competition (1st Schedule) which was telecast in January 2003 (ETV Bangla). In early 2007, she also participated in the musical game show Antakshari (Star Plus) where she represented East Zone.

Compositions

Anwesshaa composed and scripted the lyrics for the following singles.

She has been releasing these compositions on her YouTube channel .

 Kagojer Nouko Acoustic guitar – Rhythm Shaw, Sound engineer – Kohinoor Mukherjee)
 Devaa Vocals – Anwesshaa and Kaustuv Kanti Ganguly
 Dhun Bihu ki pukare Vocals – Trijoy Deb and Anwesshaa
 Maahiya Vocals – Anwesshaa, Music producer – Akshay Akash
 Khaamoshiyaan Vocals – Anwesshaa, Arrangement- Akshay Akash, Piano – Akshay Menon, Table – Amit Choubey, Mixing – Kohinoor Mukherjee
 Gatihara Dupur Music Producer: Shamik Chakravarty, Mixing & Mastering: Ananjan Chakraborty, Video: Visual Diary Motion Picture
 Swapno bari (Acoustic guitar – Rhythm Shaw, Sound engineer – Kohinoor Mukherjee)
 Mizaaj-e-ishq – 
 Aye chol – Vocals: Anwesshaa and Sarmishtha
 Mehek – Vocals: Anwesshaa, Sound engineer – Kohinoor Mukherjee, Producer – Akshay Menon
 Balcony - Vocals: Anwesshaa
 Teri kami - Vocals: Anwesshaa and Abhay Jodhpurkar, Sound engineer – Kohinoor Mukherjee, Producer: Akshay Menon
 Mere khuda - Vocals: Kinjal Chatterjee, Producer: Nayan Mani Barman, Mixing: Kohinoor Mukherjee
 Dooriyaan - Vocals: Anwesshaa
 Mere Khuda - Vocals: Kinjal Chatterjee
 Swapno Michhil - Vocals: Anwesshaa and Shovan Ganguly
 Bhalo Theko - Vocals: Darnibar Saha
 Intezaar - Vocals: Anwesshaa
 Smritir poth beye - Vocals: Anwesshaa
 Swag wala pyaar - Vocals: Hriti Tikadar
 Adhure Chithhi - Vocals: Anwesshaa
 Besabri - Vocals: Anwesshaa Anwesshaa has composed a mother's day special song for Svasti Ghee ad film also,

Anwesshaa has composed songs in the following :
 Lime'nLight
 Bidrohini

Filmography (partial list)

Bengali

‌Hindi

Kannada

Tamil

Telugu

Malayalam

Marathi

Rajasthani

Nepali

Assamese

Bhojpuri

Gujrati

Albums 
 Nachiketa Ebar Safar
 Neel Dariya
 E-pothe Anweshaa
 Priyotomasu
 Nana Range Anweshaa
 Aaradhana (One of several artists)
 Nilathattam (One of several artists)
 Antaranga (One of several artists)
 Ekla Tor – Sarata Din
 Aarzoo (One of several artists)
 Dil Ki Baatein (One of several artists)
 Krishnaruupa (One of several artists), song – "Shreenathji Darshan"
 Lafz Ankahe ( Various artists),
 Bollywood Unwind (various artists),
 Mizaaj-e-Ishq

Singles 
 Tum Sang (Composer: Swapnil Mistry – Nominated for Artists Aloud Best song)
 Sukh Dukh (Composer: Swapnil Mistry, Unreleased)
 Masoom Sapney (Composer: Ananjan Chakraborty)
 Kuch thikana nahi (Composer: Abhishek Ray)
 Sukha patta (Composer: Abhishek Ray)
 Raat Din  – 2021 (Composer: Ashok Raaj, co-songer: Sujoy Bhowmik)
 Phir kyun bhoola tu insaniyat (one of several artists, Composer: Sandeep-Ashutosh)
 Tere sang (Composer: Vinay Patil)
 Akash hote chai (Composer: Asheq Manzur)
 Kuch baatein yuhin hain na (Composer: Ajay Singha)
 Larzish (Composer: Abhishek Ray, Lyricist: Avinash Tripathi)
 Reshmi dhaage (Composer: Abhishek Ray, Lyricist: Avinash Tripathi)
 Saiyaan re (Composer: Prasun Das)
 Tuzya Vina (Marathi Composed By Prasad Phatak – Award for best singer, Marathi single)
 Sajan ghar aao re (Composition: Prasad Phatak; Lyrics: Sameer Samant)
 Laage buke laage (Composer: Imran Mahmudul)
 Ichhe Kore (Singer: Anwesshaa; Lyricist: Prabir Mukhopadhyay; Music Direction and Composition: Anjan Majumdar; Music Arrangements: Pt.Debojyoti (Tony) Bose; Sound Recordist: Gautam Basu, Sanjay Ghosh; Studio: Vibration & Resonance Music Video : Milton)
 Manbasiyaan (Singers: Anwesshaa & Abhishek Ray, Lyrics – Avinash Tripathi)
 Yaadon ke panchhi (Composer: Abhishek ray; Vocals – Anwesshaa & Abhishek, Lyrics – Manvendra)
 Kontya Kshani Haravati ashya (Marathi Composed By Jeevan Marathe Lyrics: Vaishali Marathe)
 Abol gandh premacha (Singers: Anwesshaa, Jeevan Marathe; Composition: Jeevan Marathe; Lyrics: Vaishali Marathe)
 Man He Vede Ka Punha (Marathi Composed By Jeevan Marathe Lyrics: Vaishali Marathe Producer : Shrinivas G. Kulkarni)
 Premamruthi Krupanidhi (Composer: Kamlakar Rao, Vocals: Anwesshaa, Mohan veena: Pt Vishwa Mohan Bhatt, Tabla: Ojas Adhiya, Harmonium: Feroz Khan and other talented artists)
 Saiyaan ree (Singer: Anwesshaa, Composition – Prasun Das)
 Dushwaari (Vocals: Anwesshaa & Abhishek Ray, Composition: Abhishek Ray, Lyrics: Avinash Swaroop)
 Aanch Laagi (Singers: Anwesshaa & Abhishek Ray, Lyrics/composition – Abhishek Ray)
 Kotha roilo (Singer: Anwesshaa, Composition – Asheq Manzur)
 Ninnu vidachi (Composer: Ashirwad Luke, Vocals: Anwesshaa)
 Entha madhuram (Composer: KY Madhuram, Vocals: Anwesshaa)
 Chitthiyon Wala yar (Singer: Anwesshaa & Abhay Jodhpurkar, Composition – Ajay Singha)
 Naman karu (Composer: Mukesh Jodhwani)
 Kehkasha (Composer: Abhishek Ray, Lyrics: Abhishek Ray)
 Ek Subah (Composer: Ananjan Chakraborty, Lyrics: Anasmita Ghosh)
 Bismil (Composer: Abhishek Ray, Lyrics: Syed Gulrez Abhishek Ray)
 Bhalobasha kare koy (Composer: Sandeep Banerji, Lyrics: Sampa Chatterjee)
 Beintehaan (Composer: Dabbu, Lyrics: Rajiv Dutta)
 Tasavvur  (Composer: Abhishek Ray, Lyrics: Avinash Tripathi)
 Tera Mera (Composer: Ananjan Chakraborty, Lyrics: Anasmita Ghosh)
 Yesayya Yesayya ne Mata chalayya (Composer: K Y Ratnam, Lyrics:Prasad Nelapudi )
 Gunj (Composer:Dr. Amit Kamle , Lyrics: Amit Kamle )
 Teri Inayat (Composer: Ulhas V, Raviraj, Lyrics: Raviraj )
 Cheyecho ja dite amay (Composer: Syed Monsoor Raviraj, Lyrics: Ellora Ameen)
 Unnadu Devudu (Composer: K Y Ratnam, Lyrics: KR John)
 Neel Aakash  (Composer: Som Chakraborty, Lyrics: Soham Majumdar )
 Padhe Paadana  (Composer: Pranam Kamlakar, Lyrics: Joshua Shaik)
 Vadhimpabadina (Composer: Pranam Kamlakar, Lyrics: Anand Tirugulla)
 Aadharinchagarava (Composer: Pranam Kamlakar, Lyrics: Joshua Shaik)
 Jeena  (Composer: Som Chakraborty, Lyrics: Priyo Chatterjee )
 Amra Korbo Joy – 2020 (Composer: Joy-Anjan, Lyrics: Traditional)
 Sara Dao - (Composer : Amit Banerjee, Lyricist : Rajiv Dutta)
 Gustakhiyaan - (Music : Som Chakraborty)

Television Songs 
Anweshaa sang the title tracks of these serials:-

Collaborations with Pranam Kamlakhar 
 Aparadhini yesayya (Composer: Pranam Kamlakhar, Vocals: Anwesshaa)
 Vesaarina (Composer: Pranam Kamlakhar, Vocals: Anwesshaa)
 Premamrudhi (Composer: Pranam Kamlakhar, Vocals: Anwesshaa)
 Kamaneeyamaina (Composer: Pranam Kamlakhar, Vocals: Anwesshaa)
 Tharinchiponi (Composer: Pranam Kamlakhar, Vocals: Anwesshaa)
 Khojaon mein (Composer: Pranam Kamlakhar, Vocals: Anwesshaa)
 Aaradhona (Composer: Pranam Kamlakhar, Vocals: Anwesshaa)
 Manninchina (Composer: Pranam Kamlakhar, Vocals: Anwesshaa)
 Aadarinchaga rava (Composer: Pranam Kamlakhar, Vocals: Anwesshaa)

Amul STAR Voice of India Chhote Ustaad 
In 2007–08, she participated in the juniors version of the popular musical reality show Amul STAR Voice of India named Chhote Ustaad. Aishwarya Majmudar was winner and Anwesha became runner up in competition.

After Chhote Ustaad 
 Anwesha recorded her second playback song for a Bengali film Khela, directed by Rituparno Ghosh, a Bengali film director, on 6 May 2008.
 Anwesha got her first break as a commercial playback singer in the film Golmaal Returns (Music Director – Pritam) where she sings for Amrita Arora/Kareena Kapoor.
 She sung the title song for the TV show Waar Parriwar by Gajendra Singh alongside Shaan.
 She will be recording a Bengali Album, which would release during the Pooja.
 Anwesha recorded a song with Planman Motion Pictures in the 2012 romantic comedy I M 24 with music director Jatin Pandit.
 Anwesha also participated in NABC-2009 held at San Jose, California where she delivered soulful numbers with Shaan
 Anwesha Tamil debut with the song called "Megam Vanthu Pogum" (Cloud comes and disappears)from the movie called Mandhira Punnagai(Mandhra of Smile), music by one of the greatest music director Vidhyasagar. For the same music director, she has recorded a new song for the new Tamil movie Ilaignan. The song title goes as Mazhaiyil Kulitha along with Karthik
 She received best female upcoming singer of the year award for the debut Tamil song in music mirchi awards 2010.
 She sang, as promised by Himesh Reshammiya (during "Music Ka Maha Muqabala"), one of the songs of the movie Dangerous Ishhq (Vikram Bhatt 2012):
 Anwesha sang the song "Banarasiya" with Shreya Ghoshal and Meenal Jain from the 2013 film Raanjhanaa with music composed by AR Rahman.
 In 2016, Anwesha made her Kannada debut with the most expected film Santheyalli Nintha Kabira (to be released) where she has sung 3 songs for Ismail Darbar.

MTV Coke Studio 
She performed a ghazal "Benaam Khwahishein" at Coke Studio on the fifth episode under the music direction of Papon.

Collaborations with Abhishek Ray 

 Kehkasha
 Bismil
 Reshmii dhaagey
 Tasavvur
 Aanch lagi
 Kuch thikana nahi
 Sukha patta
 Dushwari
 Manbasiyaa 
 Yaadon ke panchi

Awards and Nominations 
Some of the awards bestowed upon her till date are Filmfare Award (east), 2 Mirchi Music Awards (Bangla & South India), Gujarat state award, Star Parivaar Award, 3 Tele Cine Awards, Big Music Awards, Chitrapat Padarpan Puraskar (Marathi), Academia Award (Los Angeles,USA), Garber Bangali (an honour for achievers in various fields who've made Bengal proud), Tele Samman, Woman Entertainers' Award, Uttam Kalaratna Award for Music Direction etc.

References

External links 
 Anweshaa's Graphy
 Official Youtube Channel
 
 

1993 births
Living people
Indian women playback singers
Bollywood playback singers
Singers from Kolkata
Participants in Indian reality television series
20th-century Bengalis
21st-century Bengalis
Women musicians from West Bengal
21st-century Indian singers
21st-century Indian women singers
Indian women composers
Indian women singer-songwriters
Indian singer-songwriters
Indian women songwriters